Mikhail Mikhailovich Shalagin (born 19 September 1999) is a Russian professional ice hockey left winger who currently plays with HC Shakhtyor Soligorsk in the Belarusian Extraliga while under contract to HC Dinamo Minsk of the Kontinental Hockey League (KHL).

Playing career
Shalagin played as a youth within the HC Spartak Moscow organization, making his professional debut in the Supreme Hockey League on loan to Khimik Voskresensk in the 2017–18 season.

He made his Kontinental Hockey League debut for Spartak Moscow during the 2018–19 KHL season, playing in four regular season games. He primarily played 43 games with junior team JHC Spartak Moscow of the MHL tallying 75 points, earning MHL MVP honors. His 48 goals set a new league record for the most in one season.

Having gone unselected in the 2017 and 2018 NHL Entry Draft, Shalagin was drafted in the seventh round, 198th overall, in the 2019 NHL Entry Draft by the Tampa Bay Lightning.

Out of contract with Spartak Moscow, Shalagin opted to move to North America to continue his development within the Tampa Bay Lightning organization. On 6 September 2019, Shalagin was signed to a one-year AHL contract with the Lightning's affiliate, the Syracuse Crunch. After attending the Lightning's prospect and training camp, Shalagin was participated in the Crunch's training camp. He was later assigned to play the 2019–20 season with ECHL affiliate, the Orlando Solar Bears, posting 7 goals and 10 points in 41 games before the season was cancelled due to the COVID-19 pandemic.

As a free agent and with the uncertainty to the resumption of play in North America, Shalagin opted to return to his original club Spartak Moscow by agreeing to a one-year, two-way contract on 15 July 2020. In the 2020–21 season, Shalagin made 8 appearances with second tier affiliate, Khimik Voskresensk, before he was traded by Spartak Moscow to Avtomobilist Yekaterinburg in exchange for Semyon Perelyayev on 12 November 2020.

On 30 May 2021, Shalagin left Avtomobilist as he was traded in an exchange of junior prospects with VHL club, HC Ugra.

On 18 May 2022, Shalagin's KHL rights were acquired by Belarusian based club, Dinamo Minsk.

Career statistics

Awards and honours

References

External links

1999 births
Living people
Avtomobilist Yekaterinburg players
HC Dinamo Minsk players
JHC Spartak players
HC Khimik Voskresensk players
Orlando Solar Bears (ECHL) players
Russian ice hockey left wingers
HC Shakhtyor Soligorsk players
HC Spartak Moscow players
Ice hockey people from Moscow
Tampa Bay Lightning draft picks
HC Yugra players